Yaya Sow is a Guinean politician.

He is Minister of Infrastructure and Transportation in the  government led by Mohamed Béavogui  from October 2021 to November 17, 2022.

Career 
Before becoming a minister, he became the Consular Judge at the Tribunal de commerce of Guinea. 
He worked in numerous government positions including Director of Economic Studies and Commerce at the Guinean Ministry of Commerce before being hired by ECOWAS. He started at the Department of Political Economy of ECOWAS in Abuja, Nigeria, and rising through the ranks, became Resident Representative of ECOWAS to the European Union, eventually rising further to become Director of Economic Research at ECOWAS.

He also worked as an advisor for the Guinean private sector in negotiating the African Continental Free Trade Agreement.

He was decreed Minister of Infrastructure and Transportation on October 26, 202 to November 17, 2022.

References 

Living people 
Guinean judges
Year of birth missing (living people)
Infrastructure ministers of Guinea
Transport ministers of Guinea